Argyle Street railway station is a station in the City Centre of Glasgow, Scotland, on the Argyle Line, which connects the North Clyde lines at Partick with Rutherglen in the south-east of the city. The station is located below the thoroughfare whose name it bears. It has a narrow and often crowded island platform. It serves the Argyle Street shopping precinct as well as the St Enoch Centre. Along with Dalmarnock and Anderston, no services call at this station on a Sunday before 10am or after 6pm.

History
The Glasgow Central Railway was formed in 1888 to link the Clydesdale Junction Railway and Lanarkshire and Ayrshire Railway with the Lanarkshire and Dunbartonshire Railway. By the time it was opened between 1894 and 1897, the GCR had been taken over by the Caledonian Railway.

The line closed in 1964, but it was reopened by British Rail in 1979 and operated by the Scottish Region of British Railways by arrangement with the Greater Glasgow PTE. Although the Central Low Level station was reopened, Glasgow Cross was not reopened; instead the new Argyle Street station was constructed, midway between Glasgow Cross and Glasgow Central.

Station access
When the 1979 reopening took place, a simple island platform was required, but footings of adjacent buildings and other physical constraints limited the available tunnel width for the new station. Moreover, the roadway above had not yet been pedestrianised, and street access and station building construction was not acceptable within the road limits. Accordingly, station building premises were constructed within the ordinary building line on the south side of the street; access to the platforms is via Argyle Street and Osborne Street into the ticket hall, then down an escalator into the station lower level, below track level. A passageway then leads under the westbound track and a second escalator leads up to the island platform which is located directly under Argyle street.

Lift access was not considered on the grounds of expense and the physical limits of the platform space.

During the 2006/7 escalator renewal work the only passenger access to the lower level (under platform) of the station was via the steep emergency exit steps.

Ticket barriers came into operation on 17 June 2011.

Disabled access
This station does not have any disabled access due to the narrowness of the island platform. Installation of lift access would require platform widening, which would in turn require widening of the tunnel, requiring massive alteration to the buildings adjacent.

Services

From 1979
Mondays to Saturdays
 3 per hour - Dalmuir to Hamilton Circle (clockwise)
 3 per hour - Dalmuir to Hamilton Circle (anti-clockwise)
 1 per hour Limited Stop - Milngavie to Lanark

2014

On Sundays, no services call here before 10am or after 6pm so services on Sundays are -Motherwell, -Motherwell or Lanark, and Partick-Larkhall.

2020
There is a regular service of 6 trains per hour each way, This is as follows:
On Monday to Saturdays:

2 trains per hour to Larkhall via Hamilton Central.
2 trains per hour to Whifflet(1 train an hour extends to Motherwell)
4 trains per hour to Dalmuir(2 via Yoker and 2 the other via Singer)
2 trains per hour to Milgavie via Westerton.

Sundays: 
Trains only call here between 10am and 6pm on Sundays and all trains pass through without stopping after these times:

2 trains per hour to Motherwell(One via Whifflet and the other via Hamilton Central)
2 trains per hour to Balloch via Dalmuir
1 train per hour to Larkhall

Gallery

References

Sources

External links
 RAILSCOT on Glasgow Central Railway

Railway stations in Glasgow
SPT railway stations
Railway stations served by ScotRail
Railway stations in Great Britain opened in 1979
Railway stations opened by British Rail